La Salle University is a private, Catholic university in Philadelphia, Pennsylvania. The university was founded in 1863 by the Institute of the Brothers of the Christian Schools and named for St. Jean-Baptiste de La Salle.

History 

La Salle College was founded in March 1863 as an all-male college by Brother Teliow and Archbishop James Wood of the Archdiocese of Philadelphia. It was first located at St. Michael's Parish on N. 2nd Street in the Olde Kensington section of Philadelphia.  La Salle soon moved to the building vacated by St. Joseph's College at 1234 Filbert Street in Center City, Philadelphia.  In 1886, due to the development of the Center City district, La Salle moved to a third location, the former mansion of Michael Bouvier, the great-great-grandfather of Jacqueline Kennedy Onassis, at 1240 North Broad Street.  Due to space constraints, in 1930 La Salle moved to its current campus at the intersection of 20th Street and Olney Avenue in the Logan neighborhood of the city.  The new location had a suburban feel with ample land, but was linked to the city by trolleys and the newly constructed Broad Street Subway.

The 1930s proved to be a tumultuous decade for La Salle, which was nearly bankrupt after being unable to sell the 1240 North Broad Street property. The main academic building on campus, College Hall was unable to be finished due to a lack of funds, and the college nearly closed in the late 1930s.  The college's closing was prevented by a 75th Anniversary Fund Drive in 1938, spearheaded by Philadelphia businessman John McCarthy.  Funds raised from this drive also enabled La Salle to purchase a tract of land to the east of 19th Street, where Philadelphia had intended to build a city college.

La Salle nearly closed again due to a lack of students during World War II, and the football team was disbanded due to a lack of players, but the college experienced a period of growth in the late 1940s.  Several new buildings were constructed in the 1940s and 1950s, including a new library, student union, and a science building. It was also during this time that the first student residence halls were constructed at La Salle, mostly on land purchased from the former Belfield Country Club. Additional student housing was provided by purchasing or renting local homes, such as the house known as "The Mansion", on David and Logan Blain's Belfield Estate. During the 1960s, the high school section moved out due to the lack of space after many years of sharing the same campus with the College.

La Salle admitted women to its regular classes in 1970, becoming a fully co-educational institution.  A year later, La Salle opened Olney Hall, its main academic building.  It also continued to expand its property throughout the 1970s and 1980s, buying land along Chew Avenue in the Germantown section of the city, along with the Belfield Estate in 1984, and to the south of main-campus, the orphanage run by the Sisters of St. Basil the Great.  It was also during this era, in 1984, that La Salle was granted University status.  In 2007, La Salle acquired the former Germantown Hospital, now West Campus, and constructed The Shoppes at La Salle shopping center across the street in 2008. The construction of the Shoppes at La Salle and addition of The Fresh Grocer ended a decades-long food desert in Germantown.

In October 2015, La Salle inaugurated its first lay person and first woman president, Colleen Hanycz, former president of Brescia University College. In 2015, Hanycz led consolidation and prioritization efforts, ultimately firing a couple dozen prominent staff members and administrators. The university even cut six undergraduate majors, which were mostly in the foreign language department. However, just a year after her arrival, the school stated that it would decrease tuition by 29 percent. The reasoning for the significant tuition cut was to make La Salle more attractive and accessible for students from more diverse socioeconomic backgrounds.

Governance

The university is led by its board of trustees headed by a president and chair. The president serves one or more 5–year terms.  , there have been 29 Presidents. Students are represented through a democratically elected student government. The La Salle Students' Government Association sits on numerous committees led by staff and administrators, including some board meetings. La Salle's student government is a founding member of the American Student Government Association. The president's office, formerly located in the historic Peale House, is now in College Hall, the former business school building.

Academics
Within La Salle is the College of Professional and Continuing Studies and its three Schools: Arts & Sciences, Business Administration, and Nursing & Health Sciences. Communication, Nursing, and Education are the largest majors at La Salle. Courses in the programs may be offered in traditional, online, or hybrid formats.

Tuition and financial aid
In the Fall 2017 semester, La Salle University decreased its tuition by 29%, citing affordability for all students and a "renaissance" at the school. Even prior to the tuition reduction, La Salle was recognized for its value.

Admissions
Undergraduate fall enrollment declined from more than 4,500 in 2012 to 3,900 in 2018.

The average GPA for an admitted student at La Salle is a 3.35 on a 4.0 scale. Its acceptance rate is labeled as "moderately difficult" and admits about 75 percent of students who apply. La Salle requires SAT or ACT scores and an essay for admission. La Salle also uses the common application for prospective students in the United States.

According to The New York Times, the median family income of a student from La Salle is about $91,000 per year. 40 percent of La Salle students come from families in the top 20 percent of income. 37.1 percent come from families in the bottom 60 percent of income (<$65,000 per year). Less than 1 percent come from families in the top 1 percent of income ($650k+).

Academic rankings

Athletics

La Salle University's 20 varsity sports teams, known as the Explorers, compete in the NCAA's Division I. La Salle is a member of the Atlantic 10 Conference and the historic Philadelphia Big 5, an informal association of Philadelphia sports programs. As a member of the Big 5, the Explorers play against Temple University, University of Pennsylvania, Villanova University and Saint Joseph's University at least once a year at the Palestra. They have won eleven titles. La Salle has sent 16 athletes to the Olympic a total of 22 times. La Salle athletes have won a total of six Olympic medals (four gold, and two bronze) and have appeared in eleven Olympic Games.

La Salle's teams have won two national championships: The 1954 NCAA Men's Division I Basketball Tournament and the 1980 Division II AIAW Field Hockey Championship.  The school also won the 1952 National Invitation Tournament. La Salle's major historic rival has been the Hawks of Saint Joseph's University, especially in men's basketball. Not only are both universities situated in Philadelphia, but they are also both Catholic, private institutions.

The name "Explorer" derives from a 1931 mistake made by a sportswriter. The writer thought the university was named after the French explorer Sieur de La Salle, when in fact it is named after St. Jean-Baptiste de La Salle and was officially chosen in a student contest during the spring of 1932.

In 2016, La Salle University changed its tagline from "Never Stop Exploring" to "Explorers are Never Lost".

Men's basketball

The program has been rated the 53rd "Greatest College Basketball Program of All-Time" by Street & Smith's magazine and 71st by the ESPN College Basketball Encyclopedia.

La Salle has won one National Championship, one National Invitation Tournament Championship, and advanced to two Final Fours.  The Explorers have also made 12 NCAA Tournament appearances, won eight Philadelphia Big 5 city championships, and four Metro Atlantic Athletic Conference Championships.  The program is one of only two schools (with Houston) to have two players in the top 25 in all-time NCAA scoring - Lionel Simmons and Michael Brooks.  It's also had three National Players of the Year - only Duke University and Ohio State have had more.

La Salle's last successful run in the NCAA Tournament a surprising run in 2013 when La Salle went to the Sweet Sixteen as an underdog. The Explorers pulled off surprise upsets, beating ranked Kansas State and Butler University.

La Salle also has an extensive history of players who played professional basketball, including Michael Brooks, (1980 College Player of the Year), Joe Bryant (father of Kobe Bryant), Rasual Butler (formerly with the Washington Wizards), Larry Cannon, Ken Durrett, Tom Gola, (NBA Hall of Fame inductee and 1955 College Player of the Year), and Tim Legler (current basketball analyst for ESPN and 4th all-time in NBA three-point shooting percentage).

The Explorers play in Tom Gola Arena as their main home stadium and The Palestra for Philadelphia Big 5 games.

Women's basketball

Campus
La Salle moved to its fourth and present location in 1931. The campus is located in part on Belfield, the estate of Charles Willson Peale, the Revolutionary War patriot and painter famous for his portraits of the founding fathers, most notably, George Washington. The first to occupy the land of the Belfield after the passing of the famously known painter, Charles Wilson Peale, was William Logan Fisher. Fisher was born to the family of Thomas Fisher and Sarah Logan; Sarah had inherited the northeastern portion of Stenton. Fisher's roots lay deeply in La Salle's history as he owned the land that is now South Campus. After living there, Fisher gave this land to his daughter Sarah Logan Fisher and her husband William Wister. The home belonged to the Wisters until 1984 when La Salle University purchased the land. What once was the home of a famous artist, and later affluent family, is the current office of the University president.

La Salle's campus is located in the Logan, Philadelphia-Ogontz/Belfield neighborhood of Philadelphia. In May 2007, La Salle created their West Campus after buying a portion of Germantown Hospital in the Germantown neighborhood of the city. La Salle's campus is divided into 3 parts: North, South, and West campus. Both the North and South parts of campus are located in the Logan, Philadelphia-Belfield area of Philadelphia, and the western portion of campus (west of Wister Street) is located in the Germantown, Philadelphia neighborhood of the city.

La Salle University Art Museum

The La Salle Art Museum is located in the basement of Olney Hall and houses a collection of European and American art from the Renaissance to the present. The museum also owns a number of special collections including Japanese prints. The art museum is also home to the Walking Madonna, one of four by the British artist Dame Elisabeth Frink. Frink created the sculpture in 1981, the other Walking Madonna sculptures remain in England, with one in Salisbury and the other in Frink's garden at her home. In early 2018, the university announced plans to sell forty-six artworks from the La Salle University Art Museum to "help fund teaching and learning initiatives in its new strategic plan". Selling art to fund the university is controversial in the art community and the plan was criticized by artists and museum groups.

Student housing 
In 2011, St. Basil's Court was considered by DormSplash.com as the best dorm in the country. St. Basil's Court is mostly home to honors students, athletes, and upperclassmen.

Living styles vary by location. In North Residence Halls and St. Neumann, men and women live in the same building but on different floors. In St. Basil's, men and women live on the same floors but on different sides of the hall. In the St. Miguel Townhouses and Apartments, men and women live with the same gender in their own living space with a kitchen and bathrooms. In 2016, students voted to have gender-neutral housing in the St. Miguel Townhouses, which would make La Salle the only Catholic university in the country to facilitate co-ed living. This issue caused controversy in Catholic circles across the United States since it is traditional for Catholic school residence halls to be completely separated by gender. La Salle also has individual unit gender-neutral bathrooms in some of their residence halls.

Expansion

La Salle has spent about $75 million in renovations going back to 2005. In the Fall of 2005, the $26 million first phase of this master plan was completed with the construction of Tree Tops Cafe (dining hall) and St. Basil Court (Residence Hall). St. Basil's houses approximately 430 students. Three of the building's wings feature "suites", in which four students share two bedrooms and one bathroom. The fourth wing's rooms have the traditional one-room for housing two students with communal bathrooms. The facilities have lounges, study rooms, and special purpose rooms.

A $2.5 million athletic field renovation was completed in the Fall of 2006.

In May 2007, the university purchased adjacent Germantown Hospital for $10 million.  The  acquired has become "West Campus", and increased the campus size by 25 percent. A $15 million shopping center and supermarket complex opened in Fall 2008 across from the Germantown Hospital. The Shoppes at La Salle was formerly home to the university's softball field and other recreational areas. The renovated Holroyd Science Center was completed in Fall 2009 and a new business school opened in West Campus in January 2016.

In the summer of 2016, McShain Hall in the middle of campus was torn down and replaced with more green space. The new quad was named after its donor, the Hansen family.

A satellite campus and Conference Center in Newtown, Bucks County, Pennsylvania, the La Salle University Bucks County Center, offers graduate courses in various disciplines, undergraduate courses in nursing, and continuing education courses. The Conference Center comprises fifteen instructional rooms with seating capacities ranging from 20 to 40, along with four computer laboratories with 100 workstations. La Salle offers M.B.A. and Clinical-Counseling Psychology Master of Arts classes at the Plymouth Meeting Metroplex Corporate Center in Montgomery County, Pennsylvania.

In the fall of 2016, La Salle changed its motto from "Never Stop Exploring" to "Explorers are Never Lost". The change reflected a new brand campaign, coinciding with the announcement that La Salle would decrease tuition by more than 29 percent.

Student life
Students at La Salle are offered many opportunities to participate at different degrees and in many different ways. There are several organizations and a student programming center whose mission is primarily to plan activities (games, movie nights, bus trips, etc.) for the students of La Salle University. The Communication Department operates La Salle 56, a cable TV educational-access television station available to 300,000 subscribers.  The university also has a student-run radio station, WEXP and a student-run weekly newspaper, The Collegian, along with over 100 other intramurals, clubs, and NCAA Division I sports offered. La Salle University offers a number of student services, including non-remedial tutoring, a women's center, career advising and placement services, health services, and health insurance. La Salle also offers campus safety and security services like 24-hour foot and vehicle patrols, late night transport/escort service, 24-hour emergency telephones, lighted pathways/sidewalks, controlled dormitory access (key, security card, etc.). Alcohol is permitted for students of legal age, making La Salle one of the few Catholic wet campuses. La Salle is also an LGBTQ-friendly Catholic university.

Demographics
About 55 percent of the students live in college-owned, -operated or -affiliated housing and 45 percent of students live off campus near the university or commute from home. The gender distribution is about 37 percent male students and 63 percent female students. Of La Salle students, about 35 percent have cars on campus. It has a total undergraduate enrollment of about 3,947, its setting is urban, and the campus size is 133 acres.

Student media

La Salle TV
La Salle TV is a student run, public, educational, and government access (PEG) cable television station that offers an Educational-access television channel run by La Salle and carried within Philadelphia's city limits on the Comcast cable system. The station reaches over 300,000 homes and serves La Salle students and its neighbors with educational and entertaining programs. The station also serves as a hands-on teaching facility for students interested in the communication field. In 2009, La Salle 56 officially changed their name to La Salle TV due to a recent agreement with Verizon to carry the student television station. La Salle University gained the cable channel in 1991 as part of the franchise agreements between cable providers and the city of Philadelphia. The student television station is a main component of the Communication Department, which uses the department's technical facility and allows use students majoring in communication.  Notable station alumni include Meredith Marakovits.

La Salle TV features a variety of student-produced programs, including collegiate sports, entertainment, and social issues. Original student films are broadcast in addition to interviews with local and national authors, actors, musicians, athletes, and television personalities. During the academic year when the majority of new programming is produced, each show is assigned a specific timeslot. Two-hour station masters containing non-dated material fill the remaining time. The hours between 8:00pm and 12:00am are used mainly for new La Salle-produced programs.

The Collegian

The Collegian published its first issue on March 16, 1931. It is the only on-campus newspaper for La Salle. It is published weekly every Thursday throughout the school year. The newspaper is written, edited, and produced by La Salle students underneath a faculty adviser. The newspaper is not independent, meaning that it has restrictions placed by the University on what it can publish. Restrictions are placed by the Division of Student Affairs and sometimes the President's Office.

WEXP

WEXP is a college radio station with a freeform radio format. It previously broadcast on 1600 and 530 AM in the Philadelphia-area before becoming an Internet radio-only station.

WEXP opened its studio in 1972. Initially, the radio station could only be heard inside the Student Union building. However, with the advent of computers in every dorm, where AM radios became scarcer to find, the station chose to embark on an Internet-only focus, setting up a partnership with live365 beginning in the fourth quarter of 2002.  The shift in focus re-energized the station by recruiting more members and boosting listenership both on campus and across the country.

Greek life

One of the aspects of La Salle's social scene are its fraternities and sororities. In total, La Salle has fourteen Greek life organizations: Ten traditional fraternities and sororities, two Divine Nine  (historically black) organizations, and two co-educational fraternities.

Fraternities
La Salle has six chartered fraternities, five of which are nationally recognized. Sigma Phi Lambda—not to be confused with Sigma Phi Lambda, the nationally recognized sorority founded in Austin, Texas—is the only unrecognized national fraternity on La Salle's campus. Sigma Phi Lambda, however, was La Salle University's first and oldest fraternity. It was founded in 1935 by La Salle President Brother Leonard. The fraternity dissolved with La Salle's drop in enrollment during World War II, but reemerged in 1960 under the leadership of Dr. John Guischard. Brother Gerald (Gerry) Molyneaux became the moderator of the Sigma Phi Lambda fraternity in 1976, where he remains as moderator as of 2017. Science professor Roland Holroyd was also an active member and advisor for the fraternity. Holroyd would soon become the namesake of the science center, Holroyd Hall, on La Salle's main campus. Sigma Phi Lambda and Alpha Theta Alpha, the two sororities and fraternities founded at La Salle, would remain exclusive to the university.

Sororities 

La Salle's Greek life community consists of six sororities. Sororities were incorporated at La Salle after 1970, once the school started admitting women. Five La Salle sororities are nationally recognized: Alpha Sigma Tau, Gamma Phi Beta, Delta Phi Epsilon, Phi Mu, and Zeta Phi Beta. Alpha Theta Alpha's only charter is at La Salle University, where the sorority originally began. Alpha Theta Alpha was La Salle University's first sorority.

Co-educational fraternities

In addition, La Salle also offers two co-educational fraternities: a business fraternity, Delta Sigma Pi, and a community service fraternity, Epsilon Sigma Alpha.

University ministry and service
La Salle's religiously-affiliated University Ministry and Service (UMAS) program offers student ministry and community service opportunities for students. Regardless of religious affiliation, La Salle students can participate in more than a dozen weekly service and volunteer projects in Philadelphia including working at food banks, homeless shelters, the Special Olympics, and more. La Salle holds mass once a day, every week. Their Sunday liturgy has high student involvement through student ministers.

Students can also participate in service trips, known as Lasallian Immersion and Volunteer Experiences (LIVE). Service trips occur domestically and internationally. Domestic service trips include going to Habitat for Humanity programs, working in Harlan, Kentucky in Appalachia, and even going to local locations like Camden, New Jersey. International service trip volunteers go to Kenya, the Dominican Republic, Haiti, Honduras, and more. Each student's trip is subsidized by the school and by their own fundraising initiatives.

Orientation
The first day of a student's time at La Salle occurred at a student orientation program called Day ONE, which stood for Orienting New Explorers. The day consisted of giving essential information to new students and their families, but its primary objective is to build relationships: relationships between the new students and other new students, between the new students and their upper division student hosts, between new students and administration and faculty, and between the students' families and the university. The Class of 2020 was the last incoming class to participate in Day ONE. Since August 2017 for their New Student Orientation program, La Salle hosts students for a full week before classes begin in a week titled, Explorientation, and have no formal day during the summer for orientation.

Notable alumni

La Salle alumni have earned numerous accolades, scholarships, and titles including an Emmy award, a Pulitzer Prize, six Olympic gold medals, a Marshall scholarship, about one-hundred Fulbright scholarships, and more. La Salle has three alumni currently serving in the United States House of Representatives along with about a dozen representatives in the Pennsylvania General Assembly and one on the Philadelphia City Council.

See also

List of colleges and universities in Philadelphia
Lasallian educational institutions

References

External links

 
Lasallian colleges and universities
Catholic universities and colleges in Pennsylvania
Universities and colleges in Philadelphia
Association of Catholic Colleges and Universities
Philadelphia Main Line
Educational institutions established in 1863
Wister, Philadelphia
1863 establishments in Pennsylvania